Lipogya exprimataria is a species of moth of the family Geometridae first described by Francis Walker in 1863. It is found in Australia.

External links
Australian Faunal Directory

Boarmiini